Leah's Yard is a former collection of small industrial workshops situated on Cambridge Street in the city centre of Sheffield in South Yorkshire, England. The building has been designated as a Grade II* listed building because of its importance as an example of Sheffield's industrial heritage and is currently undergoing a significant restoration to bring it back into use.

History
Leah's Yard was constructed in the early part of the 19th century as a works for the manufacture of shears and other hand tools. As was typical with small works of this type. Leah's Yard had many different trade occupants and as such the building underwent many alterations and additions which are evident today. Throughout the 19th century the yard was used by a horn dealer (who supplied the cutlery handle making trade), Sheffield platers, knife manufacturers and silver stampers. In the 1880s the building was known as the Cambridge Street Horn Works. In 1892 Henry Leah took over the building as a producer of die stamps for silverware, giving the building the name that it is known by today. Sharing the building at that time was Walter Walker & Co Ltd, who were piercers and stampers; the building was alternatively known as the Cambridge Stamping Works.

At the end of the 19th century steam power was introduced to run a grinding hull and drop hammers in a silver die stamping shop. The key to the success of buildings such as Leah's Yard was that they could be adapted to provide accommodation for a number of different metal industry trades on the same site. They provided adaptable, cheap work space by crowding buildings into a confined area. By 1905, the workshops around the courtyard of Leah's Yard were occupied by eighteen little mesters whose trades included dram flask manufacturer, hollow ware and silver buffers, palette knife makers, steel fork manufacturer, silver ferrule maker, brass and nickel silver turners, electroplate producer and a cutler.

The building
The front of the Leah's Yard building which faces onto Cambridge Street has a carriage entrance within it, this opens up into a small rear courtyard surrounded by small two and three storey brick workshops. There are external wooden staircases to give access to the upper floors and large casement windows to give plenty of natural light for the workmen.

Present day
Until recently Leah's Yard stood in a derelict state, having not been used for over 20 years when the lower floor was used as a shop. The building is located between two public houses on Cambridge Street, The Benjamin Huntsman and The Tap and Tankard. The Benjamin Huntsman was constructed recently with older buildings being cleared to make way for the pub. The Leah's Yard buildings were left standing because of their listed building status. The site is part of Sheffield City Council's Heart of The City II project, and in February 2021 it was announced that Sheffield Science Park Company, which operates the similar premises Sheffield Technology Parks, had been successful in their bid to refurbish and operate Leah's Yard.

References

Industrial buildings completed in the 19th century
Industrial buildings and structures in Sheffield
History of Sheffield
Grade II* listed buildings in Sheffield